Anegan is the soundtrack album for the 2015 film of the same name, starring Dhanush and directed by K. V. Anand. For the film's soundtrack and score, Anand, roped in his regular collaborator Harris Jayaraj, to compose the music, thus marking Harris' first and only collaboration with Dhanush. The soundtrack album features six tracks, written by Vairamuthu, Kabilan Vairamuthu, Rokesh and C. S. Amudhan. The album was released by Sony Music on 2 November 2014.

Development 
In April 2014, Harris recorded a song called "Aathadi Aathadi", which was sung by Bhavatharini and written by Vairamuthu. Later, another song "Roja Kadale" was recorded in May 2014, which was revealed to be an "energetic" track, also written by Vairamuthu and sung by Shankar Mahadevan, who collaborated with Harris after Ghajini (2005). In late June 2014, Harris finished recording a "peppy number", written by director C. S. Amudhan. During the recording of Amudhan's song, K. V. Anand said that the album was in its final stages of recording and that each song would be of a different dimension based on its situation in the film. In August 2014, Harris informed via Twitter that almost all the songs were completed. The music rights were acquired by Sony Music.

Release 
The makers initially planned to release the songs in the middle of September 2014 and later on the occasion of Diwali (22 October 2014). However, the makers announced that the film's audio will be released on 2 November 2014. Prior to the release, the album was made available through iTunes on 1 November 2014, and the following day, the audio was launched at the Suryan FM 93.5 Radio Station, in the presence of the film's cast and crew. The soundtrack for the Telugu version Anekudu was released on 23 January 2015, at a promotional event held at Hyderabad.

Track listing

Tamil

Telugu

Reception

Tamil version  

The soundtrack album received positive reviews, with the song "Danga Maari Oodhari" has been praised by listeners and audiences. Behindwoods gave the album 3 out of 5 and stated "Harris Jeyaraj in his trademark style gives a solid album for Dhanush." Indiaglitz gave the album 2.75 out of 5 and stated "Harris webs his magic once again for K.V. Anand." The Times of India, gave 3 out of 5 to the album and stated "Harris and Anand made a fantabulous comeback with a string of songs encompassing different variety of genres of music." Moviecrow gave the album 3.25 out of 5 and stated "With a script that supposedly has a narrative timeline of more than 4 distinct time periods, the music had to be true to the period while being catchy. Harris Jayaraj had a tough job in his hands and appears to have had opted for the least risky route of keeping the music orchestration mostly contemporary. Nevertheless, Anegan marks Harris' come back after a brief struggle in form. Harris has given just enough ammunition to Director KV Anand and his team to work on the visual departments of the songs." Milliblog reviewed it as "Anegan is a mild improvement, if you compare it with Harris’ last 3 soundtracks." Music Aloud gave 7.5 out of 10 to the soundtrack and stated "The reuse/inspiration aspect notwithstanding, Anegan is the best soundtrack that Harris Jayaraj has produced for KV Anand from among their four outings together."

Telugu version  

The Times of India, gave 3 out of 5 to the album and stated "Harris has come up with a string of songs encompassing different genres of music." 123Telugu reviewed it as "Harris Jayraj’s music is pretty good as all the songs have been composed and shot well. Background score is apt and suits the mood of the film. As said earlier, production values are top notch as the makers have spent enough to make their film look rich."

References 

2014 soundtrack albums
Tamil film soundtracks
Harris Jayaraj albums
Sony Music India soundtracks
Romance film soundtracks
Action film soundtracks